Krasiczyn is a village in Przemyśl County, Subcarpathian Voivodeship, in south-eastern Poland. It is the seat of the gmina (administrative district) called Gmina Krasiczyn. The village has a population of 440.

In Krasiczyn stands the Krasicki Palace, a Renaissance palace built for Stanisław Krasicki by Galleazzo Appiani.

Adam Stefan Sapieha, a cardinal whom Pope John Paul II described as 'my model', was born in Krasiczyn, in the castle.

History

As a result of the first of Partitions of Poland (Treaty of St-Petersburg dated 5 July 1772, the Galicia area was attributed to the Habsburg Monarchy. When a postoffice was opened in 1869, the town was in the Przemyśl Bezirkshauptmannschaft.

For more details, see the article Kingdom of Galicia and Lodomeria.

References

External links
 Krasiczyn website
 Iwona Kraus gallery
 Krasiczyn photographs
 Photographs
 Photographs

Villages in Przemyśl County